Derna Polazzo (27 March 1912 – 3 January 1994) was an Italian sprinter and long jumper. She was born in Trieste.

Achievements

National titles
Polazzo twice won the individual national championship.
1 win in  80 metres (1929)
1 win in  Long jump (1928)

See also
 Italy national relay team

References

External links
 

1912 births
1994 deaths
Italian female sprinters
Italian female long jumpers
Athletes (track and field) at the 1928 Summer Olympics
Olympic athletes of Italy
Sportspeople from Trieste
People from Austrian Littoral
Italian Austro-Hungarians